Hopovo may refer to:

 Staro Hopovo Monastery, a monastery in Srem, Vojvodina, Serbia
 Novo Hopovo Monastery, a monastery in Srem, Vojvodina, Serbia